= Rubus cubitans =

Scientific classification
- Kingdom: Plantae
- Clade: Embryophytes
- Clade: Tracheophytes
- Clade: Spermatophytes
- Clade: Angiosperms
- Clade: Eudicots
- Clade: Rosids
- Order: Rosales
- Family: Rosaceae
- Genus: Rubus
- Species: R. cubitans

Binomial name
- Rubus cubitans Blanch. 1906

Berry and plant

Rubus cubitans, the sprawling dewberry, is a rare North American species of flowering plant in the rose family. It has been found only in the State of Vermont in the northeastern United States.

Rubus cubitans is a trailing biennial with first-year stems running along the surface of the ground. Stems have very few prickles. Leaves are hairless, palmately compound with 5 leaflets. Second-year stems are erect, zigzag branches with trifoliate leaves and an array of flowers at the top. Fruit is black and spherical.

The genetics of Rubus is extremely complex, so that it is difficult to decide on which groups should be recognized as species. There are many rare species with limited ranges such as this. Further study is suggested to clarify the taxonomy.
